Benichab  is a town and urban commune in the Inchiri Region of southern-central Mauritania.

References

Communes of Mauritania